Maurice Rollinat (December 29, 1846 in Châteauroux, Indre – October 26, 1903 in Ivry-sur-Seine) was a French poet and musician.

Early works
His father represented Indre in the National Assembly of 1848, and was a friend of George Sand, whose influence is very marked in young Rollinat's first volume, Dans les brandes (1877), and to whom it was dedicated.

Brief fame
After its publication, he abandoned realism and worked in a very different manner.  He joined a literary circle that called themselves Les Hydropathes, founded by Émile Goudeau, an anti-clerical group with ties to the decadent literary movement. Under their influence wrote the poems that made his reputation.  In Les Névroses, with the sub-title Les Âmes, Les Luxures, Les Refuges, Les Spectres, Les Ténèbres, he showed himself as a disciple of Charles Baudelaire. He constantly returns in these poems to the physical horrors of death, and is obsessed by unpleasant images. Less outre in sentiment are L'Abîme (1886), La Nature, and a book of children's verse, Le Livre de la Nature (1893).

He was musician as well as poet, and set many of his songs to music. Several evenings a week, Rollinat would appear at the cabaret Le Chat Noir, and there he would perform his poems with piano accompaniment.  His gaunt and pale appearance made his portrait a favourite subject for a number of painters, and the startling subjects of his verses brought him short lived fame; at the height of his popularity he drew a number of celebrities to the cabaret to see him perform; among them were Leconte de Lisle and Oscar Wilde.  Rollinat's friend Jules Barbey d'Aurevilly wrote that "Rollinat might be Baudelaire's superior in the sincerity and depth of his diabolism".

Rollinat married the actress Cécile Pouettre.  He lost his reason in consequence of his wife's death from rabies; after several suicide attempts, he died in an insane asylum at Ivry-sur-Seine.  He is buried in the Saint-Denis cemetery in Châteauroux.

On Rollinat's death, Auguste Rodin offered the Fresselines commune a bas-relief entitled "Poet and the Muse". This sculpture is on display on the wall of the village church at Crozant.

Publications
 1877 : Dans les brandes
 1883 : Les Névroses
 1886 : L'Abîme
 1887 : Dix mélodies nouvelles
 1892 : La Nature
 1893 : Le Livre de la nature (anthology)
 1896 : Les Apparitions
 1898 : Ce que dit la Vie et ce que dit la Mort
 1899 : Paysages et paysans
 1903 : En errant, proses d'un solitaire

Posthumes

 1904 : Ruminations : proses d'un solitaire
 1911 : Les Bêtes

Contemporary editions
 Œuvres (éditées par R. Miannay - 1977) - Lettres Modernes Minard :
I. Dans les brandes (1877)
 II. Les Névrôses (1883)

References

 Régis Miannay, Maurice Rollinat, poète et musicien du fantastique, Badel, 1981.
 Hugues Lapaire, Rollinat, poète et musicien, Mellotté, 1932.
 Claire Le Guillou, Rollinat : ses amitiés artistiques, Joca seria, 2004.
 Association des amis de M. Rollinat, Actes du colloque 1996 (The hundredth anniversary of the poet's birth), 2005.

External links

 Biography and several poems 
 A selection of his verse 
 
 
 

1846 births
1903 deaths
People from Châteauroux
French poets
Deaths in mental institutions
French male poets
19th-century poets
19th-century French male writers